La Libertad (in English: The Liberty) is a region in northwestern Peru. Formerly it was known as the Department of La Libertad. It is bordered by the Lambayeque, Cajamarca and Amazonas regions on the north, the San Martín Region on the east, the Ancash and Huánuco regions on the south and the Pacific Ocean on the west. Its capital is Trujillo, which is the nation's third biggest city. The region's main port is Salaverry, one of Peru's largest ports. The name of the region is Spanish for "freedom" or "liberty"; it was named in honor of the Intendencia of Trujillo's proclaiming independence from Spain in 1820 and fighting for that. It is the ninth smallest department in Peru, but it is also its second-most populous department after Piura and its second-most densely populated department after Lambayeque.

Name

During the viceroyalty of Peru, the La Libertad region, together with the present-day regions of Lambayeque, Piura and Tumbes regions in Peru, and Guayaquil and El Oro Province in Ecuador, were all within the jurisdiction of the Intendencía de Trujillo. These were included in the domain of the city of Trujillo; together they comprised the Departamento de Trujillo of the viceroyalty.

After the Intendencía joined the emancipation cause and was the first to gain independence from Spain, in 1825 the Congress of the Peruvian republic changed the name to Departmento de la Libertad. Since the late 20th century, Peru has decentralized its government. All former Departments in Peru are now called Regions; their governors are elected, and they have more independent authority in decisionmaking.

Geography
La Libertad is the only Peruvian region that includes all three natural regions of the nation: coast, Sierra (highlands), and selva (rainforest).

Trujillo, the capital, has a strategic location, near where the Andes come closest to the coast. Seen from Trujillo, the Andes appears as a row of low-elevation hills. The Andean Plateau increases altitude sharply to the east, in the provinces of Otuzco and Santiago de Chuco. These two provinces comprise the Pacific hydrographic watershed, which give rise to the Moche and Virú rivers, to the south, and Chicama River to the north. Pacasmayo Province, located more to the north, is along the coast. To the east, Sánchez Carrión Province waterways drain into the Amazon River and thus belong to the Atlantic Ocean watershed.

Demographics

Population
La Libertad region is the third-most populous in Peru; the census 2007 recorded 1,617,050 residents, representing 5.9% of the Peruvian population. It was surpassed only by the Department of Lima and Piura. In 2012 its capital Trujillo is the second-most populated metropolitan area in Peru and the largest city in northern Peru. The largest population is concentrated in provincial capitals and districts, which comprise the majority urban population in La Libertad region. The migrant population to the region comes from border departments and immigrants from other countries.

Principal cities
The principal cities in La Libertad region are shown in the next table.

{| class="wikitable sortable"
|-----
! Nº.
! City
! PopulationCens. 2007
! District
! Province
! Mayor
|-----
| 1°
| Trujillo
| 682.834
| Trujillo
| Trujillo
| Daniel Marcelo Jacinto
|-----
| 2°
| Chepén
| 41,358
| Chepén
| Chepén
| José David Lías Ventura
|-----
| 3°
| San Pedro de Lloc
| 16.198
| San Pedro de Lloc
| Pacasmayo
| Victor Raúl Cruzado Rivera
|-----
| 4°
| Pacasmayo
| 26.125
| Pacasmayo
| Pacasmayo
| César Rodolfo Milla Manay
|-----
| 5°
| Guadalupe
| 36,580
| Guadalupe
| Pacasmayo
| Benjamín Javier Banda Abanto|-----
| 6°
| Santiago de Chuco
| 25.000
| Santiago de Chuco
| Santiago de Chuco
| Juan Gabriel Alipioz|-----
| 7°
| Virú
| 36.029
| Virú
| Virú
| Andrés Ostino Chávez Gonzáles|-----
| 8°
| Otuzco
| 25.134
| Otuzco
| Otuzco
| Heli A. Verde Rodríguez|-----
| 9°
| Huamachuco
| 59,407
| Huamachuco
| Sánchez Carrión
| Benito Robert Contreras Morales|-----
| 10°
| Cascas
| Juan Julio Iglesias Gutiérrez| Cascas
| Gran Chimú
| -|-----
| 11°
| Bolívar
| Odar Sánchez Peche| Bolívar
| Bolívar
| -|-----
| 12°
| Tayabamba
| Omar Armando Iparraguirre Espinoza| Tayabamba
| Pataz
| -|-----
| 13°
| Julcán
| Marco Antonio Rodríguez Espejo| Julcán
| Julcán
| -|-----
| 14°
| Ascope
| -| Ascope
| Ascope
| John Román Vargas Campos|-----
| 15°
| Casa Grande
| –
| Casa Grande
| Ascope
| –
|-----
| 15°
| Paiján
| –
| Paiján
| Ascope
| –

|}

Political division

The Region is separated into 12 provinces (provincias), political divisions that generally correspond to counties in the United States of America. A Peruvian Region has as its head political executive a governor (governador), an elected official. The head political executive of each province is a lieutenant governor (teniente governador), an official appointed by the governor. These 12 provinces comprise a total of 80 districts (distritos). The provinces, with their capitals are:

Economy

Principal companies
Some of the main companies in La Libertad Region are the following:
Cementos Pacasmayo. It manufactures cement and it is based in Pacasmayo Province.
Sociedad Agrícola Virú, dedicated to agribusiness and based in Virú Province
SEDALIB, water supply and sanitation company based in Trujillo city
Caja Trujillo, banking company centered in Trujillo
Cesar Vallejo University, based in Víctor Larco city

Archaeology

The coastal strip set the stage for the rise of many pre-Columbian cultures, such as the pre-Ceramic Huaca Prieta civilization, which is more than 5,000 years old & the Cupisnique, which is more than 3,000 years old.  From 200 A.C., the first one to expand beyond its cradle was the Moche or Mochica culture. It was basically an agriculture and/or a warrior culture, which built countless temples and palaces such as the Sol (Sun), Luna (Moon), El Brujo & Cao Viejo, and other huacas. The Chimú culture emerged later and built its capital in Chan Chan, the largest pre-Columbian city in South America, & huacas like Esmeralda & Arco Iris (Rainbow). At its zenith, Chan Chan was home to 60,000 inhabitants who stubbornly resisted the expansion of the Inca Empire. These ancient cultures used irrigation canals and water reservoirs, which systems were increasingly better engineered and extensive over the years. The technological acumen of these sophisticated agricultural systems was carried into the Inca Empire, which surrounded the remnants of the prior cultures. The Spanish colonizers destroyed most of the agricultural works to more effectively establish political control and provide de facto slave labor from the displaced native agriculturalists.

The archaeological remains of Chan Chan, 6 km (3.7 mi) northeast of downtown Trujillo, are rather well-preserved despite being built out of adobe (mud bricks), largely because 1) dearth of rainfall and consequent erosion, and 2) lack of significant re-use of its construction materials (adobes do not respond easily to removal and transport and are relatively cheap to make on-site in current methods of construction).

During the Late Moche phase (AD 600 to 850), one of the largest power centers of the region was the fortified site of Cerro Chepén in the Jequetepeque Valley.

Cerro Chepén has a sophisticated system of fortifications, and a dominant position on top of the hill, with many monumental buildings. Recent excavations at the site revealed that there was much internal conflict there that affected local communities.

Archeological sites
Some of the archeological sites in La Libertad Region are:
Chan Chan
El Brujo
Huaca del Sol
Huaca de la Luna
Marcahuamachuco
Pakatnamu
Pirqa Pirqa
San José de Moro
Huaca Santa Clara
Wiraquchapampa
Archeological Complex Caballo Muerto

Places of interest
 Calipuy National Sanctuary

Ecological regions

Water supply and sanitation
The public company for water supply and sanitation in La Libertad Region is SEDALIB which is formed by shareholders of municipalities of the Region.

Culture

Festivals and events
Spring Festival
Marinera FestivalInternational Calzaferia El Porvenir. It is a fair of footwear and in 2012 took place the 10th edition; it is held in El Porvenir city.Regional Fair of the Pineapple'''. It is held in the town of Poroto.
Virgin of La Puerta. Patronal Feast; the celebration originated in 1664 when it placed the image of the Virgin at the entrance of Otuzco as precaution of the risk of a pirate raid. The main day is celebrated on December 15 every year and in 2012 the feast of Our Lady of the Gate was declared a National Cultural Heritage by the Peruvian government.
Contradanza. Expression cultivated in Huamachuco city, in the villages Urpay, Shiracmaca and Culicanda. This dance in 2012 has been declared a National Cultural Heritage by the Peruvian government.

See also
Chimú culture
Moche
Cupisnique
Marcahuamachuco
1970 Ancash earthquake

References

 
Regions of Peru
Cupisnique culture